Héctor Emmanuel Cáceres (born 12 December 1988) is an Argentine professional footballer who plays as a midfielder for Villa San Antonio.

Career
Cáceres' early years were spent in the lower leagues with Racing de Trelew, Central Norte and Villa San Antonio. In 2008, Cáceres agreed terms with Atlético Concepción. After five goals in nineteen games for the aforementioned team, Cáceres was signed by Torneo Argentino A side Juventud Antoniana; who he'd feature seventeen times for. Cáceres played for Villa Cubas in 2012–13 in tier four, which fell in-between one-year stints with Talleres. He left Talleres for a second time in mid-2014, subsequently spending the rest of the year with Camioneros Argentinos. In 2016, Pellegrini of Torneo Argentino B signed Cáceres.

Later in 2016, Cáceres rejoined Central Norte though departed eighteen months later to resign for Villa San Antonio. On 18 June 2018, Cáceres completed a move to Primera B Metropolitana outfit Defensores Unidos. He made his professional league debut on 24 August versus Estudiantes, with his opening goals for them arriving in September against Sacachispas and Almirante Brown. 2020 saw Cáceres resign with Villa San Antonio, now of the Torneo Regional Federal Amateur.

Personal life
Cáceres, alongside his role as a footballer, is one of the lead vocalists of his cumbia santafesina band Toco y Me Voy.

Career statistics
.

References

External links

1988 births
Living people
People from Salta
Argentine footballers
Association football midfielders
Torneo Argentino B players
Torneo Argentino A players
Primera B Metropolitana players
Racing de Trelew players
Juventud Antoniana footballers
Talleres de Perico footballers
Central Norte players
Defensores Unidos footballers
Sportspeople from Salta Province